Isobutyl chloride (1-chloro-2-methylpropane) is an organochlorine compound. It is a chlorinated derivative of isobutane.

Synthesis 
Isobutyl chloride can be synthesized in a substitution reaction by reacting isobutanol with hydrochloric acid:
 
(CH3)2CH-CH2-OH\ +\ HCl -> [\ce{H2SO4}_\text{(conc)}] (CH3)2CH-CH2-Cl

References

Chloroalkanes